Aratathomas's yellow-shouldered bat (Sturnira aratathomasi) is a species of bat in the family Phyllostomidae native to South America.

Taxonomy and etymology
It was described as a new species in 1968. The first documentation of the species, however, had occurred almost 100 years prior in 1874. The authors received the specimens from Andrew Arata and Maurice Thomas—the species name "aratathomasi" is a portmanteau of their respective last names.

Description
In 1987, this species was called one of the largest frugivorous New World bat species, as well as the largest member of its genus (Sturnira has been expanded since then, though). Individuals weigh . Its fur is dark gray in color.

Biology and ecology
Its diet likely consists of fruit, pollen, and nectar.

Range and habitat
It is found in association with the Andes in Colombia, Ecuador, Peru, and Venezuela.

Conservation
As of 2016, it is evaluated as a least-concern species by the IUCN. It is threatened by agricultural conversion to grow opium poppies.

References

Sturnira
Mammals of Colombia
Mammals described in 1968
Taxonomy articles created by Polbot
Bats of South America